Nicolin is a surname. Notable people with the surname include:

Curt Nicolin (1921–2006), Swedish businessman
Eduardo Ibarrola Nicolín (born 1951), Mexican diplomat
Yves Nicolin (born 1963), French politician

See also
Nicolina (disambiguation)